Brian Kirkham (born 1 January 1986) is an Australian racing cyclist who represents Australia in BMX. He represented Australia at the 2012 Summer Olympics in the men's BMX event, finishing in 25th place.

References

External links
 
 
 
 
 

1986 births
Living people
Australian male cyclists
BMX riders
Olympic cyclists of Australia
Cyclists at the 2012 Summer Olympics